Lucky is a 2017 American drama film, starring Harry Dean Stanton and directed by John Carroll Lynch from a screenplay by Logan Sparks and Drago Sumonja. It was one of Stanton's final onscreen roles before his death. The film tells the story of 90-year-old Lucky as he comes to terms with his own mortality and searches for enlightenment. It received positive reviews from critics.

Plot
As the film begins, a tortoise trudges into view in the desert. We meet Lucky, who lives alone in an isolated house in the small desert town of Piru, California. He drinks a glass of cold milk after his morning yoga and cigarette before getting dressed and heading out on his daily routine.

He gets coffee at a diner where he is on friendly terms with the owner, Joe. He works on a crossword puzzle from his daily newspaper. Lucky then walks to a convenience store where he buys another pack of cigarettes and a carton of milk. The owner, Bibi, tells Lucky that her son Juan is having his tenth birthday in a week. That evening, Lucky stops at a bar called Elaine's and has a few Bloody Marias with the locals. One of the regulars, Howard, is depressed that his pet tortoise, named President Roosevelt, has escaped.

The next morning, Lucky becomes entranced by the blinking numbers on his coffeepot. He gets light-headed and falls over, smashing his ceramic mug. At a clinic, Dr. Christian Kneedler gives Lucky a clean bill of health and tells him that Lucky has out-smoked and outlived the majority of people his age. At the diner, Lucky mentions how he fell and everyone becomes concerned for his safety. That night, Lucky calls a friend while he watches TV. He tells his friend that when he was a boy in Kentucky, he shot a mockingbird with his BB gun. He describes how devastating the silence was, and that it was the saddest thing he had ever experienced. Lucky thanks his friend for listening and hangs up.

Back at the bar, Lucky listens to a story from one of the regulars, Paulie, about how he met and married his wife. Lucky reflects on how he never married or had any lasting relationships. Lucky sees Howard talking with a lawyer named Bobby Lawrence about making a will for himself and wanting to leave all of his possessions to his pet tortoise. Lucky is hostile to Bobby and challenges him to a fight outside, but Paulie tells him that Bobby won't fight him and that he should go home. A day or two later, Joe's employee Loretta visits Lucky to check on him. While smoking marijuana, Lucky shows Loretta old photos of his time in the US Navy and they watch old VHS tapes of Liberace in concert. While having coffee at the diner, Lucky runs into Bobby Lawrence and tells him about his accident. Bobby tells Lucky about a time when he nearly got hit by a garbage truck and tells Lucky to always be prepared for the unexpected. Lucky visits a pet store and buys a box of live crickets.

Lucky meets a World War II Marine veteran named Fred and tells him about his time in the US Navy during the war in the Pacific. Lucky explains that he got his nickname from having the relatively safe job of cook on an LST. Fred tells Lucky a story about how after the Marines secured a beach, the locals began to commit suicide by jumping off cliffs. After a battle, he encountered a child, smiling amidst the carnage. Fred remarked to his fellow Marine that at least someone was glad to see them, only to be told that the girl was a Buddhist and was smiling at the prospect of dying. The story leaves Lucky speechless. Upon returning home, he sets the clock on his coffee machine to the correct time, stopping it from blinking. He attends Bibi's son Juan's birthday party and enjoys himself. He spontaneously sings "Volver Volver" in Spanish for the party goers.

That evening, Lucky goes back to the bar for more Bloody Marias. Howard has not found his tortoise and has concluded that all things must eventually come to an end. Lucky then attempts to light a cigarette at the bar despite being ordered not to do so by the owner, Elaine. He delivers a speech to the bar patrons that everything goes away eventually and that we are left with nothing. Elaine asks what is one supposed to do with nothing. Lucky simply replies "you smile". The remark transforms the mood of the bar; Lucky lights up his cigarette and steps outside.

The next morning, Lucky goes for a walk through town, as he always does, and passes by the outdoor botanic garden and the bar where he was previously banned for smoking. In the desert, Lucky looks up at a tall saguaro cactus and lights a cigarette. He breaks the fourth wall and smiles at the camera before heading back into town. As Lucky walks down the road alone, a tortoise again trudges into view.

Cast
 Harry Dean Stanton as "Lucky"
 David Lynch as Howard
 Ron Livingston as Bobby Lawrence
 Ed Begley Jr. as Dr. Christian Kneedler
 Tom Skerritt as Fred
 Barry Shabaka Henley as Joe
 James Darren as Paulie
 Beth Grant as Elaine
 Yvonne Huff as Loretta
 Hugo Armstrong as Vincent
 Bertila Damas as Bibi
 Ana Mercedes as Victoria, Bibi's Mother
 Amy Claire as Frances, Pet Shop Worker

Production
On July 7, 2016, it was revealed that Lucky had begun filming in Los Angeles.

On April 7, 2017, it was announced that Magnolia Pictures acquired U.S. and international rights to distribute the film.

Reception
On Rotten Tomatoes, Lucky has a rating of 97%, based on 139 reviews, with an average score of 7.82/10. The website's critical consensus reads, "Lucky is a bittersweet meditation on mortality, punctuating the career of beloved character actor Harry Dean Stanton." On Metacritic, the film has a score of 80 out of 100, based on 34 critics, indicating "generally favorable reviews".

Matt Zoller Seitz of RogerEbert.com gave the film four out of four stars, writing that the film is: "The humblest deep movie of recent years, a work in the same vein as American marginalia like Stranger Than Paradise and Trees Lounge,' but with its own rhythm and color, its own emotional temperature, its own reasons for revealing and concealing things." Seitz later named Lucky as the best film of 2017, stating that "I didn't expect much more than indie-film quirk when I read the description of this film, but emotionally it destroyed me."

Accolades

Notes

References

External links
 
 
 
 
 
 

2017 films
American drama films
2017 directorial debut films
2010s English-language films
2010s American films